Lepidoptera of Cuba consist of both the butterflies and moths recorded from the island of Cuba.

According to a recent estimate, there are about of 1,557 Lepidoptera species present on the island.

Butterflies

Papilionoidea

Papilionidae

Papilioninae

Battus devilliersii (Godart, 1823)
Battus polydamas (Dufrane, 1946)
Eurytides celadon (Lucas, 1852)
Heraclides andraemon Hübner, [1823]
Heraclides androgeus (Godman & Salvin, 1890)
Heraclides aristodemus (Esper, 1794)
Heraclides caiguanabus (Poey, [1852])
Heraclides oxynius (Geyer, 1827)
Heraclides pelaus (Bates, 1935)
Heraclides thoas (Gundlach, 1866)
Papilio demoleus Linnaeus, 1758
Papilio polyxenes Fabricius, 1775
Parides gundlachianus (Felder & Felder, 1864)
Pterourus palamedes (Drury, 1773)
Pterourus troilus (Linnaeus, 1758)

Hesperiidae

Hesperiinae
Asbolis capucinus (Lucas, 1857)
Atalopedes mesogramma (Latreille, [1824])
Calpodes ethlius (Stoll, 1782)
Choranthus radians (Lucas, 1857)
Cymaenes tripunctus (Herrich-Schäffer, 1865)
Euphyes cornelius (Latreille, [1824])
Euphyes singularis (Herrich-Schäffer, 1865)
Holguinia holguin Evans, 1955
Hylephila phyleus (Drury, 1773)
Lerodea eufala (Edwards, 1869)
Nyctelius nyctelius (Latreille, [1824])
Oarisma bruneri Bell, 1959
Oarisma nanus (Herrich-Schäffer, 1865)
Panoquina corrupta (Herrich-Schäffer, 1865)
Panoquina lucas (Fabricius, 1793)
Panoquina ocola (Edwards, 1863)
Panoquina panoquinoides (Skinner, 1891)
Parachoranthus magdalia (Herrich-Schäffer, 1863)
Perichares philetes (Gmelin, 1790)
Polites baracoa (Lucas, 1857)
Pyrrhocalles antiqua (Herrich-Shaffer, 1863)
Rhinthon cubana (Herrich-Schäffer, 1865)
Saliana esperi Smith & Hernández, 1992
Synapte malitiosa (Herrich-Schäffer, 1865)
Wallengrenia otho (Lucas, 1857)

Pyrginae

Aguna asander (Mabille & Bouillet, 1912)
Aguna claxon Evans, 1952
Anastrus sempiternus (Bell & Comstock, 1948)
Astraptes anaphus (Godman & Salvin, 1896)
Astraptes cassander (Fabricius, 1793)
Astraptes habana (Lucas, 1857)
Astraptes talus (Cramer, 1799)
Astraptes xagua (Lucas, 1857)
Autochton cellus (Boisduval & Leconte, 1833)
Burca braco (Herrich-Schäffer, 1865)
Burca concolor (Herrich-Schäffer, 1865)
Burca cubensis (Skinner, 1913)
Cabares potrillo (Lucas, 1857)
Carystoides mexicana Freeman, 1969
Chioides marmorosa (Herrich-Schäffer, 1865)
Chiomara mithrax (Möschler, 1878)
Eantis papinianus (Poey, 1832)
Eantis munroei (Bell, 1956)
Epargyreus zestos (Geyer, 1832)
Ephyriades arcas (Fabricius, 1775)
Ephyriades brunnea (Herrich-Schäffer, 1865)
Ephyriades zephodes (Hübner, 1820)
Erynnis zarucco (Lucas, 1857)
Gesta gesta (Herrich-Schäffer, 1863)
Ouleus fridericus (Geyer, 1832)
Phocides pigmalion (Lucas, 1857)
Polygonus leo (Gmelin, [1790])
Proteides maysi (Lucas, 1857)
Proteides mercurius (Lucas, 1857)
Pyrgus crisia (Herrich-Schäffer
Pyrgus oileus (Linnaeus, 1767)
Urbanus dorantes (Lucas, 1857)
Urbanus proteus (Scudder, 1872)

Pieridae

Coliadinae

Abaeis nicippe (Cramer, 1779)
Anteos clorinde (Godart, [1824])
Anteos maerula (Fabricius, 1775)
Aphrissa neleis (Boisduval, 1836)
Aphrissa statira d´Almeida, 1939
Colias eurytheme Boisduval, 1852
Eurema amelia (Poey, 1853)
Eurema boisduvaliana (Felder & Felder, 1865)
Eurema daira (Godart, 1819)
Eurema elathea (Cramer, 1777)
Eurema lucina (Poey, 1853)
Kricogonia cabrerai Ramsden, 1920
Kricogonia lyside (Godart, 1819)
Nathalis iole Boisduval, 1836
Phoebis agarithe Brown, 1929
Phoebis argante (Butler, 1869)
Phoebis avellaneda (Herrich-Schäffer, 1864)
Phoebis philea (Johansson, 1763)
Phoebis sennae (Linnaeus, 1758)
Pyrisitia chamberlaini (Bates, 1934)
Pyrisitia dina (Poey, 1832)
Pyrisitia larae (Herrich-Schäffer, 1862)
Pyrisitia lisa (Ménétriés, 1832)
Pyrisitia messalina (Fabricius, 1787)
Pyrisitia nise (Cramer, 1775)
Pyrisitia proterpia (Fabricius, 1775)
Pyrisitia venusta (Dillon, 1947)
Zerene cesonia (Stoll, 1790)

Dismorphiinae
Dismorphia cubana (Herrich-Schäffer, 1862)

Pierinae

Ascia monuste (Fabricius, 1775)
Ganyra menciae (Ramsden, 1915)
Glutophrissa drusilla (Butler, 1872)
Melete salacia Fruhstorfer, 1908
Pontia protodice (Boisduval & Leconte, 1833)

Riodinidae
Dianesia carteri (Holland, 1902)

Lycaenidae

Theclinae

Allosmaitia coelebs (Herrich-Schäffer, 1862)
Chlorostrymon maesites (Herrich-Schäffer, 1865)
Chlorostrymon simaethis (Drury, 1770)
Electrostrymon angelia (Hewitson, 1874)
Eumaeus atala (Poey, 1832)
Ministrymon azia (Hewitson, 1873)
Nesiostrymon celida (Lucas, 1857)
Strymon acis (Comstock & Huntington, 1943)
Strymon bazochii Bates, 1934
Strymon istapa (Hewitson, 1874)
Strymon limenia (Hewitson, 1868)
Strymon martialis (Herrich-Schäffer, 1864)
Strymon toussainti (Comstock & Hungtinton, 1943)
Ziegleria hernandezi (Johnson & Kroenlein, 1993)

Polyommatinae

Brephidium exilis (Herrich-Schäffer, 1862)
Cyclargus ammon (Lucas, 1857)
Hemiargus hanno (Poey, 1832)
Leptotes cassius (Lucas, 1857)
Leptotes hedgesi Schwartz & Johnson, 1992
Pseudochrysops bornoi Smith & Hernández, 1992

Nymphalidae

Apaturinae
Asterocampa idyja (Geyer, [1828])
Doxocopa laure (Hübner, 1823)

Biblidinae
Dynamine egaea Bates, 1934
Dynamine postverta d'Almeida, 1952
Eunica heraclitus (Poey, 1847)
Eunica monima (Cramer, 1782)
Eunica tatila Kaye, 1926
Hamadryas amphichloe (Fruhstorfer, 1916)
Hamadryas amphinome (Lucas, 1853)
Hamadryas feronia (Linnaeus, 1758)
Lucinia sida Hübner, [1823]
Marpesia chiron (Fabricius, 1775)
Marpesia eleuchea (Hübner, 1818)

Charaxinae

Anaea cubana (Druce, 1905)
Archaeoprepona demophon (Fruhstorfer, 1904)
Hypna clytemnestra (Herrich-Schäffer, 1862)
Memphis verticordia (Doubleday, [1849])
Memphis echemus (Doubleday, [1849])
Siderone galanthis (Illiger, 1802)

Danainae
Anetia briarea Hübner, 1823
Anetia cubana (Salvin, 1869)
Anetia pantherata (Hall, 1925)
Danaus eresimus Forbes, 1943
Danaus gilippus (Cramer, 1779)
Danaus plexippus (Linnaeus, 1758)
Greta cubana (Herrich-Schäffer, 1862)
Lycorea halia Felder & Felder, 1865

Heliconiinae
Agraulis vanillae Maynard, 1869
Dryas iulia (Bates, 1934)
Eueides isabella Geyer, 1832
Heliconius charithonia Comstock & Brown, 1950

Libytheinae

Libytheana carinenta (Kirtland, 1851)
Libytheana motya (Hübner, 1826)
Libytheana terena Godart, 1819

Limenitinae
Adelpha iphicleola Fruhstorfer, 1915
Limenitis archippus (Strecker, 1878)

Nymphalinae

Anartia chrysopelea Hübner, 1825
Anartia jatrophae Munroe, 1942
Anthanassa frisia (Poey, 1832)
Antillea pelops (Herrich-Schäffer, 1864)
Atlantea perezi (Herrich-Schäffer, 1862)
Colobura dirce (Comstock, 1942)
Euptoieta claudia (Cramer, 1779)
Euptoieta hegesia (Cramer, 1779)
Historis acheronta (Bates, 1939)
Historis odius (Fabricius, 1775)
Hypanartia paullus (Fabricius, 1793)
Hypolimnas misippus (Linnaeus, 1764)
Junonia coenia Hübner, 1822
Junonia evarete Felder & Felder, 1867
Junonia genoveva (Stoll, 1782)
Phyciodes phaon (Edwards, 1864)
Polygonia interrogationis (Fabricius, 1798)
Siproeta stelenes (Fruhstorfer, 1907)
Vanessa atalanta (Fruhstorfer, 1909)
Vanessa cardui (Linnaeus, 1758)
Vanessa virginiensis (Drury, 1773)

Satyrinae
Calisto bradleyi Munroe, 1950
Calisto brochei Torre, 1973
Calisto bruneri Michener, 1949
Calisto hysius (Godart, 1819)
Calisto israeli Torre, 1973
Calisto muripetens Bates, 1939
Calisto occulta Núñez, 2012
Calisto smintheus Bates, 1935

Moths

Nepticuloidea

Nepticulidae

Nepticulinae
Enteucha gilvafascia (Davis, 1978)
Manoneura basidactyla (Davis, 1978)

Opostegidae
Pseudopostega adusta (Walsingham, 1897)
Pseudopostega crassifurcata Davis & Stonis, 2007
Pseudopostega mignonae Davis & Stonis, 2007
Pseudopostega saltatrix (Walsingham, 1897)
Pseudopostega turquinoensis Davis & Stonis, 2007

Adeloidea

Heliozelidae
Heliozela ahenea Walsingham, 1897

Tineoidea

Psychidae

Psychinae
Cryptothelea surinamensis (Möschler, 1878)
Paucivena cubana Núñez, 2006
Paucivena ferruginea Núñez, 2006
Paucivena fusca Núñez, 2006
Paucivena hoffmanni (Koehler, 1939)
Paucivena orientalis Núñez, 2006
Paucivena pinarensis Núñez, 2006
Prochalia licheniphilus (Koehler, 1939)

Oiketicinae
Biopsyche thoracica (Grote, 1865)
Oiketicus kirbyi Guilding, 1827
Thyridopteryx ephemeraeformis (Haworth, 1803)

Tineidae

Acrolophinae
Acrolophus arcanella (Clemens, 1859)
Acrolophus basistriatus Davis, 1987
Acrolophus dimidiella (Walsingham, 1892)
Acrolophus fuscisignatus Davis, 1987
Acrolophus guttatus Davis, 1987
Acrolophus leucodocis (Zeller, 1877)
Acrolophus niveipunctatus Walsingham, 1892
Acrolophus noctuina (Walsingham, 1892)
Acrolophus plumifrontella (Clemens, 1859)
Acrolophus popeanellus (Clemens, 1859)
Acrolophus vitellus Poey, 1833

Harmacloninae
Harmaclona cossidella Busck, 1914

Meessiinae
Antipolistes anthracella Forbes, 1933
Eudarctia tischeriella (Forbes, 1931)
Homostinea curviliniella Dietz, 1905
Oenoe pumiliella (Walsingham, 1897)

Setomorphinae
Setomorpha rutella Zeller, 1852

Tineinae
Cubotinea orghidani Capuse & Georgescu, 1977
Niditinea praeumbrata (Meyrick, 1919)
Phereoeca uterella (Walsingham, 1897)
Praeacedes atomosella (Walker, 1863)
Tinea cretella Walsingham, 1897
Tinea pallidorsella Zeller, 1877

Erechthiinae
Erechthias minuscula (Walsingham, 1897)
Erechthias zebrina (Butler, 1881)
Ereunetis aeneoalbida (Walsingham, 1897)
Ereunetis particolor (Walsingham, 1897)

Hieroxestinae
Opogona antistacta Meyrick, 1937

Gracillaroidea

Gracillariidae

Gracillariinae
Acrocercops albomarginatum (Walsingham, 1897)
Acrocercops cissiella Busck, 1934
Acrocercops clitoriella Busck, 1934
Acrocercops cordiella Busck, 1934
Acrocercops inconspicua Forbes, 1930
Acrocercops ipomoeae Busck, 1934
Acrocercops maranthaceae Busck, 1934
Acrocercops melantherella Busck, 1934
Acrocercops undifraga Meyrick, 1931
Caloptilia aeneocapitella (Walsingham, 1891)
Caloptilia burserella (Busck, 1900)
Caloptilia perseae (Busck, 1920)
Chilocampyla psidiella Busck, 1934
Dialectica rendalli Walsingham, 1897
Dialectica sanctaecrucis Walsingham, 1897
Eucosmophora cupreella Walsingham, 1897
Eucosmophora sideroxylonella Busck, 1900
Marmara gulosa Guillén & Davis, 2001
Metriochroa psychotriella Busck, 1900
Neurobathra curcassi Busck, 1934
Neurostrota gunniella (Busck, 1906)
Neurostrota pithecolobiella Busck, 1934
Spanioptila spinosum Walsingham, 1897

Lithocolletinae
Phyllonorycter stigmaphyllae Busck, 1934
Phyllonorycter tenuicaudella (Walsingham, 1897)
Porphyrosela desmodiella (Clemens, 1859)

Phyllocnistinae
Phyllocnistis citrella Stainton, 1856

Yponomeutoidea

Yponomeutidae

Yponomeutinae
Yponomeuta triangularis Möschler, 1890

Argyresthiidae
Argyresthia diffractella Zeller, 1877

Plutellidae

Plutellinae
Plutella xylostella (Linnaeus, 1758)

Glyphipterigidae

Glyphipteriginae
Glyphipterix paradisea Walsingham, 1897
Ussara eurythmiella Busck, 1914

Acrolepiinae
Acrolepiopsis cestrella (Busck, 1934)

Attevidae
Atteva aurea (Fitch, 1856)
Atteva gemmata (Grote, 1873)

Heliodinidae
Aetole schulzella (Fabricius, 1794)

Bedeliidae
Bedellia minor Busck, 1900

Lyonetiidae

Cemiostominae
Leucoptera coffeella (Guérin– Méneville, 1842)

Gelechioidea

Blastobasidae

Blastobasinae
Auximobasis insularis Walsingham, 1897

Schistoneidae
Schistonoea fulvidella (Walshingham, 1897)

Elachistidae

Agonoxeninae
Prochola fuscula Forbes, 1931

Depressariinae
Gonionota bruneri Busck, 1934
Gonionota rosacea (Forbes, 1931)
Psittacastis stigmaphylli (Walsingham, 1912)

Elachistinae
Dicranoctetes saccharella (Busck, 1934)

Ethmiinae
Ethmia abraxasella Busck, 1914
Ethmia confusella (Walker, 1863)
Ethmia confusellastra Powell, 1973
Ethmia cubensis Busck, 1934
Ethmia decui Capuse, 1981
Ethmia hiramella Busck, 1914
Ethmia julia Powell, 1973
Ethmia nivosella (Walker, 1864)
Ethmia notatella (Walker, 1864)
Ethmia oterosella Busck, 1934
Ethmia parabittenella Capuse, 1981
Ethmia piperella Powell, 1973
Ethmia phylacis Busck, 1934
Ethmia phylacops Powell, 1973
Ethmia scythropa Walsingham, 1912
Ethmia sibonensis Capuse, 1981
Ethmia submissa Busck, 1914
Ethmia subsimilis Walsingham, 1897
Ethmia termenalbata Capuse, 1981
Ethmia unilongistriella Capuse, 1981

Stenomatinae
Mothonica cubana Duckworth, 1969
Mothonica ocellea Forbes, 1930
Stenoma comma Busck, 1911

Batrachedridae

Batrachedrinae
Homaledra sabalella (Chambers, 1880)

Cosmopterigidae

Cosmopteriginae
Cosmopterix adrastea Koster, 2010
Cosmopterix amalthea Koster, 2010
Cosmopterix attenuatella (Walker, 1864)
Cosmopterix dapifera Hodges, 1962
Cosmopterix floridanella Beutenmüller, 1889
Cosmopterix similis Walsingham, 1897
Cosmopterix teligera Meyrick, 1915
Pebobs elara Koster, 2010
Pebobs sanctivincenti (Walsingham, 1892)
Pyroderces rileyi (Walsingham, 1882)

Chrysopeleiinae
Ascalenia pancrypta (Meyrick, 1915)
Ithome curvipunctella (Walsingham, 1892)
Ithome pernigrella (Forbes, 1931)
Perimede purpurescens Forbes, 1931
Stilbosis lonchocarpella Busck, 1934
Walshia miscecolorella (Chambers, 1875)

Gelechiidae

Anacampsinae
Anacampsis desectella (Zeller, 1877)
Anacampsis lagunculariella Busck, 1900
Anacampsis meibomiella Forbes, 1931
Battaristis concisa Meyrick, 1929
Brachyacma palpigera (Walsingham, 1892)
Strobisia iridipennella Clemens, 1860

Dichomeridinae
Dichomeris acuminata (Staudinger, 1876)
Dichomeris piperata (Walsingham, 1892)
Helcystogramma hibisci (Stainton, 1859)
Helcystogramma melissia (Walsingham, 1911)

Gelechiinae
Aristotelia eupatoriella Busck, 1934
Chionodes phalacra (Walsingham, 1911)
Evippe evippella (Forbes, 1931)
Keiferia lycopersicella (Walsingham, 1897)
Nealyda pisoniae Busck, 1900
Nealyda neopisoniae Clarke, 1946
Phthorimaea operculella (Zeller, 1873)
Polyhymno luteostrigella Chambers, 1874
Stegasta bosqueella (Chambers, 1875)
Stegasta capitella (Fabricius, 1794)
Stegasta postpallescens (Walsingham, 1897)
Symmetrischema striatella (Murtfeldt, 1900)
Telphusa perspicua (Walsingham, 1897)
Thiotricha godmani (Walsingham, 1892)
Thiotricha sciurella (Walsingham, 1897)
Tildenia gudmannella (Walsingham, 1897)

Pexicopinae
Pectinophora gossypiella (Saunders, 1844)
Prostomeus brunneus Busck, 1903
Sitotroga cerealella (Olivier, 1789)

Pterophoroidea

Pterophoridae

Ochyroticinae
Ochyrotica fasciata Walsingham, 1891

Pterophorinae
Adaina bipunctatus (Möschler, 1890)
Adaina ipomoeae Bigot & Etienne, 2009
Adaina perplexus (Grossbeck, 1917)
Adaina praeusta (Möschler, 1890)
Adaina thomae (Zeller, 1877)
Dejongia californicus (Walsingham, 1880)
Exelastis montischristi (Walsingham, 1897)
Exelastis pumilio (Zeller, 1873)
Lantanophaga pusillidactylus (Walker, 1864)
Lioptilodes albistriolatus (Zeller, 1877)
Megalorhipida leucodactylus (Fabricius, 1794)
Michaelophorus dentiger (Meyrick, 1916)
Postplatyptilia antillae Gielis, 2006
Sphenarches anisodactylus (Walker, 1864)

Schreckensteinioidea

Schreckensteiniidae
Schreckensteinia festaliella (Hübner, [1819])

Urodoidea

Urodidae

Urodinae
Urodus calligera (Zeller, 1877)
Urodus ovata (Zeller, 1877)

Choreutoidea

Choreutidae

Choreutinae
Brenthia confluxana (Walker, 1863)
Brenthia cubana Heppner, 1985
Brenthia gregori Heppner, 1985
Brenthia hibiscusae Heppner, 1985
Brenthia sapindella Busck, 1934
Hemerophila diva (Riley, 1889)
Hemerophila rimulalis (Zeller, 1875)
Tebenna leptilonella (Busck, 1934)
Tortyra ignita (Zeller, 1877)
Tortyra iocyaneus Heppner, 1991
Tortyra vividis Busck, 1934

Tortricoidea

Tortricidae

Chlidanotinae
Ardeutica melidora Razowski, 1984
Ardeutica mezion Razowski, 1984
Auratonota paidosocia Razowski & Becker, 1999
Auratonota cubana Razowski & Becker, 1999
Thaumatographa cubensis Heppner, 1983

Olethreutinae
Ancylis bauhiniae Busck, 1934
Ancylis cordiae Busck, 1934
Bactra philocherda Diakonoff, 1964
Bactra verutana Zeller, 1875
Cacocharis albimacula (Walsingham, 1892)
Crocidosema plebejana Zeller, 1847
Cryptaspasma bipenicilla Brown & Brown, 2004
Cydia largo Heppner, 1981
Cydia latiferreana (Walsingham, 1879)
Cydia rana (Forbes, 1924)
Endothenia anthracana (Forbes, 1931)
Epiblema strenuana (Walker, 1863)
Episimus argutana (Clemens, 1860)
Episimus augmentana (Zeller, 1877)
Episimus guiana (Busck, 1913)
Episimus kimballi Heppner, 1994
Episimus nesoites (Walsingham, 1897)
Episimus rufatus Razowski & Brown, 2008
Episimus semicirculanus Walker, 1863
Episimus transferrana (Walker, 1863)
Episimus tyrius Heinrich, 1923
Ethelgoda texanana (Walsingham, 1879)
Eucosma gomonana Kearfott, 1907
Gymnandrosoma aurantianum Lima, 1927
Gymnandrosoma leucothorax Adamski & Brown, 2001
Rhyacionia frustrana (Comstock, 1880)
Rhyacionia subtropica Miller, 1960
Ricula incisiva Razowski & Becker, 2011
Ricula maculana (Fernald, 1901)
Strepsicrates smithiana Walsingham, 1892

Tortricinae
Aethes pinara Razowski & Becker, 2007
Aethes seriatana (Zeller, 1875)
Aethesoides distigmatana (Walsingham, 1897)
Amorbia concavana (Zeller, 1877)
Amorbia effoetana Möschler, 1890
Amorbia revolutana (Zeller, 1877)
Apotoforma rotundipennis (Walsingham, 1897)
Argyrotaenia cubae Razowski & Becker, 2010
Argyrotaenia granpiedrae Razowski & Becker, 2010
Argyrotaenia vinalesiae Razowski & Becker, 2010
Clepsis peritana (Clemens, 1860)
Cochylis parallelana Walsingham, 1887
Cochylis sierraemaestrae Razowski & Becker, 2007
Eugnosta fraudulenta Razowski & Becker, 2007
Lasiothyris subsorbia Razowski & Becker, 2007
Lorita lepidulana Forbes, 1931
Lorita scarificata (Meyrick, 1917)
Mictopsichia cubae Razowski, 2009
Mimeugnosta particeps Razowski, 1986
Platphalonidia holguina Razowski & Becker, 2007
Platphalonidia remissa Razowski & Becker, 2007
Platynota calidana (Zeller, 1877)
Platynota rostrana (Walker, 1863)
Saphenista cubana Razowski & Becker, 2007
Saphenista mayarina Razowski & Becker, 2007
Saphenista rosariana Razowski & Becker, 2007
Saphenista simillima Razowski & Becker, 2007
Saphenista turguinoa Razowski & Becker, 2007
Sparganothis sulfureana (Clemens, 1860)
Talponia geton Razowski & Becker, 2011
Talponia necopina Razowski & Becker, 2011
Talponia phantolinea Razowski & Becker, 2011
Teras jamaicana Walker, 1863

Cossoidea

Cossidae

Cossinae
Prionoxystus piger (Grote, 1865)

Zeuzerinae
Psychonoctua personalis Grote, 1865

Sesiidae

Sesiinae
Sannina uroceriformis Walker, 1856
Synanthedon cubana (Herrich-Schäffer, 1866)

Zygaenoidea

Lacturidae
Lactura subfervens (Walker, 1854)

Limacodidae
Alarodia immaculata (Grote, 1865)
Alarodia minuscula Dyar, 1927
Alarodia pygmaea (Grote, 1867)
Leucophobetron argentiflua (Geyer, 1827)

Megalopygidae

Megalopyginae
Megalopyge krugii (Dewitz, 1877)
Perola bistrigata Hampson, 1898

Unplaced
Hysterocladia latiunca Hopp, 1927

Zygaenidae

Procridinae
Setiodes nana (Herrich-Schäffer, 1866)

Thyridoidea

Thyrididae

Siculodinae
Hexeris enhydris Grote, 1875
Rhodoneura sparsireta Hampson, 1906
Rhodoneura thiastoralis (Walker, 1859)
Zeuzerodes maculata Warren, 1907

Striglininae
Banisia myrsusalis (Walker, 1859)

Hyblaeoidea

Hyblaeidae
Hyblaea puera (Cramer, 1777)

Hedylidae
Macrosoma rubedinaria Walker, 1862

Pyraloidea

Pyralidae

Chrysauginae
Bonchis munitalis (Lederer, 1863)
Caphys biliniata (Stoll, 1781)
Carcha hersilialis Walker, 1859
Epitamyra albomaculalis (Möschler, 1890)
Lepidomys irrenosa Guenée, 1852
Murgisca subductellus (Möschler, 1890)
Pachypalpia dispilalis Hampson, 1895
Penthesilea difficilis (Felder & Rogenhofer, 1875)
Salobrena recurvata (Möschler, 1886)
Salobrena vacuana (Walker, 1863)
Streptopalpia minusculalis (Möschler, 1890)
Tosale oviplagalis (Walker, [1866])

Galleriinae
Achroia grisella (Fabricius, 1794)
Corcyra cephalonica (Stainton, 1866)
Galleria mellonella (Linnaeus, 1758)
Omphalocera cariosa Lederer, 1863

Epipaschiinae
Carthara abrupta (Zeller, 1881)
Dasyvesica cyrilla (Schaus, 1922)
Deuterollyta majuscula (Herrich-Schäffer, 1871)
Deuterollyta maroa (Schaus, 1922)
Deuterollyta ragonoti (Möschler, 1890)
Homura nocturnalis (Lederer, 1863)
Macalla phaeobasalis Hampson, 1916
Macalla thyrsisalis Walker, [1859]
Phidotricha erigens Ragonot, 1888
Phidotricha vedastella (Schaus, 1922)
Pococera iogalis Schaus, 1922
Pococera jovita Schaus, 1922
Tallula atramentalis (Lederer, 1863)

Phycitinae
Amegarthria cervicalis (Dyar, 1919)
Amyelois transitella (Walker, 1863)
Anabasis ochrodesma (Zeller, 1881)
Anadelosemia texanella (Hulst, 1892)
Ancylostomia stercorea (Zeller, 1848)
Anegcephalesis arctella (Ragonot, 1887)
Anypsipyla univitella Dyar, 1914
Atheloca subrufella (Hulst, 1887)
Baphala homoeosomella (Zeller, 1881)
Bema neuricella (Zeller, 1848)
Bema yddiopsis (Dyar, 1919)
Cactoblastis cactorum (Berg, 1885)
Cadra cautella (Walker, 1863)
Chorrera extrincica (Dyar, 1919)
Crocidomera turbidella Zeller, 1848
Davara caricae (Dyar, 1913)
Dioryctria clarioralis (Walker, 1863)
Dioryctria horneana (Dyar, 1919)
Ectomyelois ceratoniae (Zeller, 1839)
Ectomyelois decolor (Zeller, 1881)
Ectomyelois muriscis (Dyar, 1914)
Elasmopalpus lignosellus (Zeller, 1848)
Ephestia elutella (Hübner, 1796)
Ephestia kuehniella Zeller, 1879
Erelieva quantulella (Hulst, 1887)
Etiella zinckenella (Treitschke, 1832)
Eurythmasis ignifatua Dyar, 1914
Fundella argentina Dyar, 1919
Fundella ignobilis Heinrich, 1956
Fundella pellucens Zeller, 1848
Homoeosoma electella (Hulst, 1887)
Hypsipyla grandella (Zeller, 1848)
Laetilia coccidivora Dyar, 1918
Laetilia obscura Dyar, 1918
Mescinia bacerella Dyar, 1919
Moodna ostrinella (Clemens, 1860)
Oncolabis anticella Zeller, 1848
Oryctometopia fossulatella Ragonot, 1888
Ozamia lucidalis (Walker, 1863)
Phycitodes olivacella (Ragonot, 1888)
Piesmopoda xanthopolys Dyar, 1914
Plodia interpunctella (Hübner, [1810–13])
Ribua innoxia Heinrich, 1940
Ribua patriciella (Dyar, 1918)
Sarasota furculella (Dyar, 1919)
Scorylus cubensis Heinrich, 1956
Strephomescinia schausella Dyar, 1919
Stylopalpia lunigerella Hampson, 1901
Ufa rubedinella (Zeller, 1848)
Ulophora guarinella (Zeller, 1881)
Unadilla maturella (Zeller, 1881)
Zamagiria fraterna Heinrich, 1956
Zamagiria hospitabilis Dyar, 1919
Zamagiria laidion (Zeller, 1881)
Zonula fulgidula (Heinrich, 1956)

Pyralinae
Ocrasa tripartitalis Herrich– Schäffer, 1871
Hypsopygia nostralis (Guenée, 1854)
Pyralis manihotalis Guenée, 1854

Crambidae

Crambinae
Argyria diplomochalis Dyar, 1913
Argyria lacteella (Fabricius, 1794)
Argyria venatella (Schaus, 1922)
Catharylla contiguella Zeller, 1872
Crambus moeschleralis Schaus, 1940
Diatraea lineolata (Walker, 1856)
Diatraea saccharalis (Fabricius, 1794)
Epina dichromella Walker, 1866
Erupa argentescens Hampson, 1896
Fissicrambus haytiellus (Zincken, 1821)
Fissicrambus minuellus (Walker, 1863)
Fissicrambus profanellus (Walker, 1866)
Microcausta flavipunctalis Barnes & McDunnough, 1913
Microcrambus atristrigellus (Hampson, 1919)
Microcrambus biguttellus (Forbes, 1920)
Microcrambus discludellus (Möschler, 1890)
Microcrambus subretusellus Błeszyński, 1967
Parapediasia detomatella (Möschler, 1890)
Parapediasia ligonella (Zeller, 1881)
Prionapteryx achatina (Zeller, 1863)
Prionapteryx elongata (Zeller, 1877)
Prionapteryx eugraphis Walker, 1863
Thaumatopsis floridella Barnes & McDunnough, 1913
Urola nivalis (Drury, 1773)

Schoenobiinae
Carectocultus perstrialis (Hübner, [1825])
Donacaula montivagella (Zeller, 1863)
Leptosteges xantholeucalis (Guenée, 1854)
Rupela leucatea (Zeller, 1863)
Rupela tinctella (Walker, 1863)
Schoenobius molybdoplectus (Dyar, 1914)

Glaphyriinae
Aethiophysa savoralis (Schaus, 1920)
Chalcoela iphitalis (Walker, 1859)
Chalcoela pegasalis (Walker, [1866])
Contortipalpia santiagalis (Schaus, 1920)
Dicymolomia julianalis (Walker, 1859)
Dicymolomia metalophota (Hampson, 1897)
Glaphyria badierana (Fabricius, 1794)
Glaphyria cedroalis (Schaus, 1924)
Glaphyria decisa (Walker, [1866])
Glaphyria cappsi Munroe, 1972
Glaphyria matanzalis (Schaus, 1920)
Glaphyria tanamoalis (Schaus, 1920)
Hellula phidilealis (Walker, 1859)
Hellula simplicalis Herrich-Schäffer, 1871
Lipocosma chiralis Schaus, 1920

Dichogaminae
Dichogama amabilis Möschler, 1890
Dichogama decoralis (Walker, 1865)
Dichogama redtenbacheri Lederer, 1863

Musotiminae
Neurophyseta avertinalis (Schaus, 1924)
Neurophyseta normalis Hampson, 1912
Odilla noralis Schaus, 1940
Undulambia albitessellalis (Hampson, 1906)
Undulambia leucostictalis (Hampson, 1895)
Undulambia polystichalis Capps, 1965

Acentropinae
Chrysendeton anicitalis (Schaus, 1924)
Chrysendeton claudialis Walker, 1859
Chrysendeton medicinalis Grote, 1881
Chrysendeton minimalis (Herrich-Schäffer, 1871)
Munroessa maralis (Schaus, 1920)
Neargyractis plusialis (Herrich-Schäffer, 1871)
Neargyractis slossonalis (Dyar, 1906)
Parapoynx allionealis Walker, 1859
Parapoynx diminutalis Snellen, 1880
Parapoynx fluctuosalis (Zeller, 1852)
Parapoynx rugosalis Möschler, 1890
Parapoynx seminealis (Walker, 1859)
Petrophila albulalis (Hampson, 1906)
Petrophila opulentalis (Lederer, 1863)
Synclita obliteralis (Walker, 1859)
Usingeriessa psalmoidalis (Schaus, 1924)

Odontiinae
Cliniodes nacrealis Munroe, 1964
Cliniodes nomadalis Dyar, 1912
Cliniodes opalalis Guenée, 1854
Microtheoris ophionalis (Walker, 1859)
Mimoschinia rufofascialis (Stephens, 1834)

Evergestinae
Evergestella evincalis (Möschler, 1890)
Symphisa amoenalis (Walker, 1862)
Trischistognatha pyrenealis (Walker, 1859)

Pyraustinae
Achyra bifidalis (Fabricius, 1794)
Achyra rantalis (Guenée, 1854)
Achyra similalis (Guenée, 1854)
Agathodes designalis Guenée, 1854
Anania nerissalis (Walker, 1859)
Apogeshna stenialis (Guenée, 1854)
Aponia insularis Munroe, 1964
Arthromastix lauralis (Walker, 1859)
Asciodes gordialis Guenée, 1854
Asturodes fimbriauralis (Guenée, 1854)
Ategumia ebulealis (Guenée, 1854)
Ategumia matutinalis (Guenée, 1854)
Atomopteryx pterophoralis (Walker, 1866)
Atomopteryx serpentifera (Hampson, 1913)
Azochis rufidiscalis Hampson, 1904
Bicilia iarchasalis (Walker, 1859)
Bicilia olivia Butler, 1875
Blepharomastix achroalis (Hampson, 1913)
Blepharomastix schistisemalis (Hampson, 1912)
Bocchoropsis pharaxalis (Druce, 1895)
Bocchoropsis plenilinealis (Dyar, 1917)
Ceratocilia liberalis (Guenée, 1854)
Ceratoclasis delimitalis (Guenée, 1854)
Chilochromopsis sceletogramma (Dyar, 1925)
Coenostolopsis apicalis (Lederer, 1863)
Conchylodes diphteralis (Geyer, 1832)
Conchylodes hedonialis (Walker, 1859)
Condylorrhiza oculatalis (Möschler, 1890)
Condylorrhiza vestigialis (Guenée, 1854)
Crocidocnemis pellucidalis (Möschler, 1890)
Cryptobotys zoilusalis (Walker, 1859)
Cyclocena lelex (Cramer, 1777)
Desmia ceresalis (Walker, 1859)
Desmia deploralis Hampson, 1912
Desmia funebralis Guenée, 1854
Desmia naclialis Snellen, 1875
Desmia ploralis (Guenée, 1854)
Desmia quadrinotalis (Herrich– Schäffer, 1871)
Desmia recurvalis Schaus, 1940
Desmia repandalis Schaus, 1920
Desmia tages (Cramer, 1777)
Desmia ufeus (Cramer, 1777)
Deuterophysa baracoalis Schaus, 1924
Deuterophysa fernaldi Munroe, 1983
Deuterophysa subrosea (Warren, 1892)
Diacme mopsalis (Walker, 1859)
Diacme phyllisalis (Walker, 1859)
Diaphania albifascialis (Hampson, 1912)
Diaphania antillia Munroe, 1960
Diaphania costata (Fabricius, 1794)
Diaphania elegans (Möschler, 1890)
Diaphania hyalinata (Linnaeus, 1767)
Diaphania immaculalis (Guenée, 1854)
Diaphania infimalis (Guenée, 1854)
Diaphania lualis (Herrich-Schäffer, 1871)
Diaphania lucidalis (Hübner, 1823)
Diaphania nitidalis (Cramer, 1781)
Diaphania oeditornalis (Hampson, 1912)
Diaphantania ceresalis (Walker, 1859)
Diaphantania impulsalis (Herrich-Schäffer, 1871)
Diasemiopsis leodocusalis (Walker, 1859)
Diastictis holguinalis Munroe, 1956
Diathrausta cubanalis Dyar, 1913
Epicorsia oedipodalis (Guenée, 1854)
Epipagis fenestralis (Hübner, 1796)
Ercta vittata (Fabricius, 1794)
Erilusa leucoplagalis (Hampson, 1898)
Eulepte concordalis Hübner, [1825]
Eulepte gastralis (Guenée, 1854)
Eulepte inguinalis (Guenée, 1854)
Geshna cannalis (Quaintance, 1898)
Glyphodes rubrocinctalis (Guenée, 1854)
Glyphodes sibillalis Walker, 1859
Hahncappsia ramsdenalis (Schaus, 1920)
Herpetogramma antillalis (Schaus, 1920)
Herpetogramma bipunctalis (Fabricius, 1794)
Herpetogramma cora (Dyar, 1914)
Herpetogramma infuscalis (Guenée, 1854)
Herpetogramma innotalis (Hampson, 1899)
Herpetogramma phaeopteralis (Guenée, 1854)
Herpetogramma semilaniata (Hampson, 1895)
Hileithia differentialis (Dyar, 1914)
Hileithia ductalis Möschler, 1890
Hileithia magualis (Guenée, 1854)
Hoterodes ausonia (Cramer, 1777)
Hyalorista limasalis (Walker, [1866])
Hyalorista taeniolalis (Guenée, 1854)
Hydriris ornatalis (Duponchel, 1832)
Hymenia perspectalis (Hübner, 1796)
Lamprosema santialis Schaus, 1920
Leucochroma corope (Cramer, 1781)
Leucochroma jamaicensis Hampson, 1912
Lineodes contortalis Guenée, 1854
Lineodes gracilalis Herrich-Schäffer, 1871
Lineodes integra (Zeller, 1873)
Lineodes multisignalis Herrich-Schäffer, 1868
Lineodes triangulalis Möschler, 1890
Loxomorpha cambogialis (Guenée, 1854)
Lygropia fusalis Hampson, 1904
Lygropia imparalis (Walker, [1866])
Lygropia tripunctata (Fabricius, 1794)
Lypotigris reginalis (Cramer, 1781)
Marasmia cochrusalis (Walker, 1859)
Marasmia trapezalis (Guenée, 1854)
Maruca vitrata (Fabricius, 1787)
Microphysetica hermeasalis (Walker, 1859)
Microthyris anormalis (Guenée, 1854)
Microthyris prolongalis (Guenée, 1854)
Mimophobetron pyropsalis (Hampson, 1904)
Mimorista botydalis (Guenée, 1854)
Mimorista tristigmalis (Hampson, 1899)
Neohelvibotys neohelvialis (Capps, 1967)
Neoleucinodes elegantalis (Guenée, 1854)
Neoleucinodes torvis Capps, 1948
Oenobotys glirialis (Herrich-Schäffer, 1871)
Oenobotys vinotinctalis (Hampson, 1895)
Omiodes cuniculalis Guenée, 1854
Omiodes indicata (Fabricius, 1775)
Omiodes insolutalis Möschler, 1890
Omiodes martyralis (Lederer, 1863)
Omiodes simialis Guenée, 1854
Omiodes stigmosalis (Warren, 1892)
Ommatospila narcaeusalis (Walker, 1859)
Ostrinia penitalis (Hampson, 1913)
Palpita flegia (Cramer, 1777)
Palpita isoscelalis Munroe, 1959
Palpita kimballi Munroe, 1959
Palpita persimilis Munroe, 1959
Palpita quadristigmalis (Guenée, 1854)
Palpusia eurypalpalis (Hampson, 1912)
Pantographa suffusalis Druce, 1895
Penestola bufalis (Guenée, 1854)
Penestola simplicialis (Barnes & McDunnough, 1913)
Phaedropsis illepidalis (Herrich-Schäffer, 1871)
Phaedropsis impeditalis (Herrich-Schäffer, 1871)
Phaedropsis placendalis (Möschler, 1890)
Phaedropsis principaloides (Möschler, 1890)
Phaedropsis stictigramma (Hampson, 1912)
Phlyctaenia fovifera (Hampson, 1913)
Pilocrocis ramentalis Lederer, 1863
Pleuroptya silicalis (Guenée, 1854)
Polygrammodes elevata (Fabricius, 1794)
Polygrammodes ostrealis (Guenée, 1854)
Polygrammodes ponderalis (Guenée, 1854)
Portentomorpha xanthialis (Guenée, 1854)
Praeacrospila melanoproctis (Hampson, 1899)
Prenesta quadrifenestralis (Herrich-Schäffer, 1871)
Psara dryalis (Walker, 1859)
Psara hesperialis (Herrich-Schäffer, 1871)
Psara pargialis (Schaus, 1920)
Psara subaurantialis (Herrich-Schäffer, 1871)
Pseudopyrausta cubanalis (Schaus, 1920)
Pyrausta cardinalis (Guenée, 1854)
Pyrausta episcopalis (Herrich-Schäffer, 1871)
Pyrausta germanalis (Herrich-Schäffer, 1871)
Pyrausta gracilalis (Herrich-Schäffer, 1871)
Pyrausta insignitalis (Guenée, 1854)
Pyrausta panopealis (Walker, 1859)
Pyrausta phyllidalis (Schaus, 1940)
Pyrausta signatalis (Walker, [1866])
Pyrausta tyralis (Guenée, 1854)
Rhectocraspeda periusalis (Walker, 1859)
Salbia cassidalis Guenée, 1854
Salbia haemorrhoidalis Guenée, 1854
Samea carettalis Schaus, 1940
Samea conjunctalis Schaus, 1940
Samea ecclesialis Guenée, 1854
Samea multiplicalis (Guenée, 1854)
Sathria internitalis (Guenée, 1854)
Sisyracera inabsconsalis (Möschler, 1890)
Sisyracera subulalis (Guenée, 1854)
Sparagmia gonoptera Munroe, 1958
Spilomela minoralis Hampson, 1912
Spilomela personalis (Herrich-Schäffer, 1871)
Spilomela pervialis (Herrich-Schäffer, 1871)
Spoladea recurvalis (Fabricius, 1775)
Steniodes mendica (Hedemann, 1894)
Sufetula diminutalis (Walker, [1866])
Sufetula grumalis Schaus, 1920
Syllepis marialis Poey, 1832
Syllepte amando (Cramer, 1777)
Syllepte belialis (Walker, 1859)
Syllepte patagialis Zeller, 1852
Syllepte viridivertex Schaus, 1920
Synclera jarbusalis (Walker, 1859)
Syngamia florella (Cramer, 1781)
Tanaophysa adornatalis Warren, 1898
Terastia meticulosalis Guenée, 1854
Trichaea pilicornis Herrich-Schäffer, 1866
Triuncidia eupalusalis (Walker, 1859)
Udea rubigalis (Guenée, 1854)
Zenamorpha discophoralis (Hampson, 1899)

Mimallonoidea

Mimallonidae
Cicinnus packardii (Grote, 1865)

Drepanoidea

Doidae
Doa cubana Schaus, 1906

Lasiocampoidea

Lasiocampidae

Macromphaliinae
Artace cribrarius (Ljungh, 1825)

Bombycoidea

Bombycidae

Bombycinae
Bombyx mori (Linnaeus, 1758)

Saturniidae

Saturniinae
Philosamia ricini (Boisduval, 1856)
Copaxa denda Druce, 1894

Sphingidae

Macroglossinae
Aellopos blaini Herrich-Schäffer, [1869]
Aellopos clavipes (Rothschild & Jordan, 1903)
Aellopos fadus (Cramer, 1775)
Aellopos tantalus (Drury, 1773)
Aellopos titan (Clark, 1936)
Callionima calliomenae (Schaufuss, 1870)
Callionima gracilis (Jordan, 1923)
Callionima parce (Fabricius, 1775)
Callionima ramsdeni (Clark, 1920)
Cautethia grotei Edwards, 1882
Enyo boisduvali (Oberthür, 1904)
Enyo lugubris (Linnaeus, 1771)
Enyo ocypete (Linnaeus, 1758)
Erinnyis alope (Drury, 1773)
Erinnyis crameri (Schaus, 1898)
Erinnyis ello (Linnaeus, 1758)
Erinnyis guttularis (Walker, 1856)
Erinnyis lassauxii (Boisduval, 1859)
Erinnyis obscura (Fabricius, 1775)
Erinnyis oenotrus (Cramer, 1780)
Erinnyis pallida Grote, 1865
Eumorpha fasciatus (Sulzer, 1776)
Eumorpha labruscae (Linnaeus, 1758)
Eumorpha satellitia (Grote, 1865)
Eumorpha mirificatus (Grote, 1875)
Eumorpha vitis (Linnaeus, 1758)
Eupyrrhoglossum sagra (Poey, 1832)
Hyles lineata (Fabricius, 1775)
Isognathus rimosa (Grote, 1865)
Madoryx pseudothyreus (Grote, 1865)
Pachylia ficus (Linnaeus, 1758)
Pachylia syces Hübner, [1819]
Pachylioides resumens (Walker, 1856)
Perigonia divisa Grote & Robinson, 1865
Perigonia lefebvrii (Lucas, 1857)
Perigonia lusca (Fabricius, 1777)
Phryxus caicus (Cramer, 1777)
Pseudosphinx tetrio (Linnaeus, 1771)
Xylophanes chiron Rothschild & Jordan, 1906
Xylophanes clarki Ramsden, 1921
Xylophanes gundlachi (Herrich-Schäffer, 1863)
Xylophanes irrorata (Grote, 1865)
Xylophanes pluto (Fabricius, 1777)
Xylophanes porcus (Hübner, [1823])
Xylophanes robinsoni (Grote, 1865)
Xylophanes tersa (Linnaeus, 1771)

Sphinginae
Adhemarius daphne (Rothschild & Jordan, 1903)
Agrius cingulata (Fabricius, 1775)
Cocytius antaeus (Drury, 1773)
Cocytius duponchel (Poey, 1832)
Cocytius haxairei Cadiou, 2006
Cocytius vitrinus Rothschild & Jordan, 1910
Manduca afflicta (Grote, 1865)
Manduca brontes (Grote, 1865)
Manduca rustica (Wood, 1915)
Manduca sexta (Butler, 1875)
Nannoparce poeyi (Grote, 1865)
Neococytius cluentius (Cramer, 1775)
Protambulyx strigilis (Linnaeus, 1771)

Geometroidea

Sematuridae
Mania aegisthus (Fabricius, 1793)

Uraniidae

Epipleminae
Antiplecta triangularis Warren, 1906
Coeluromima reticularia (Möschler, 1890)
Epiplema incolorata (Guenée, 1857)
Gymnoplocia mamillata (Felder & Rogenhofer, 1875)
Nedusia fimbriata Herrich-Schäffer, 1870
Philagraula slossoniae Hulst, 1896
Powondrella cingillaria Geyer, 1837
Schidax anosectaria Guenée, [1858]
Schidax squamaria Hübner, 1818
Syngria ramosaria (Möschler, 1890)
Trotorhombia metachromata (Walker, 1861)

Uraniinae

Urania boisduvalii (Guérin, 1829)
Urania poeyi (Herrich-Schäffer, 1868)

Geometridae

Oenochrominae
Almodes terraria Guenée, [1858]
Ametris nitocris (Cramer, 1780)
Ergavia subrufa Warren, 1897

Ennominae
Bagodares rectisignaria (Herrich-Schäffer, 1870)
Covellia procrastinata Ferguson, 2009
Cyclomia mopsaria (Guenée, [1858])
Cyclomia plagaria (Guenée, [1858])
Cymatophora insularis (Warren, 1906)
Epimecis detexta (Walker, 1860)
Epimecis scolopaiae (Drury, 1773)
Erastria decrepitaria (Hübner, [1823])
Erosina hyberniata Guenée, [1858]
Hydatoscia ategua (Druce, 1892)
Iridopsis divisata Warren, 1905
Iridopsis eupepla Warren, 1906
Iridopsis idonearia (Walker, 1860)
Iridopsis rufisparsa Warren, 1906
Leucula simplicaria (Guenée, [1858])
Lomographa angelica (Schaus, 1923)
Macaria acutaria (Walker, 1863)
Macaria centrosignatha Herrich-Schäffer, 1870
Macaria distribuaria Hübner, [1825])
Macaria regulata (Fabricius, 1775)
Melanochroia chephise (Stoll, 1782)
Melanochroia geometroides (Walker, 1854)
Melanochroia regnatrix Grote & Robinson, 1867
Nepheloleuca complicata (Guenée, [1858])
Nepheloleuca politia (Guenée, [1858])
Nereidania opalina (Warren, 1908)
Numia albisecta Warren, 1906
Numia terebintharia Guenée, [1858]
Oenoptila paluma (Schaus, 1938)
Oxydia cubana (Warren, 1906)
Oxydia vesulia (Walker, 1860)
Parilexia antilleata Ferguson, 2009
Parilexia nicetaria (Guenée, 1857)
Parilexia proditata (Walker, 1861)
Patalene ephyrata (Guenée, [1858])
Patalene epionata (Guenée, [1858])
Patalene hamulata (Guenée, [1858])
Patalene olyzonaria (Walker, 1860)
Pero amanda (Druce, 1898)
Pero cubana Herbulot, 1994
Pero nerisaria (Walker, 1860)
Pero zalissaria (Walker, 1860)
Phrygionis auriferaria (Hulst, 1887)
Phrygionis paradoxata (Guenée, 1857)
Phyllodonta decisaria (Herrich-Schäffer, 1870)
Pityeja nazada (Druce, 1892)
Prochoerodes exiliata (Herrich-Schäffer, 1870)
Prochoerodes gundlachi Becker, 2002
Psamatodes pernicata (Guenée, [1858])
Psamatodes trientata (Herrich-Schäffer, 1870)
Sabulodes laticlavia Rindge, 1978
Sabulodes subopalaria (Walker, 1860)
Semiothisa cellulata (Herrich-Schäffer, 1870)
Semiothisa acepsimaria Schaus, 1923
Semiothisa debiliata (Warren, 1897)
Semiothisa pacianaria Schaus, 1923
Semiothisa santiagaria (Schaus, 1923)
Sericoptera virginaria (Hulst, 1886)
Sphacelodes fusilineata (Walker, 1860)
Sphacelodes vulneraria (Hübner, 1823)
Thyrinteina arnobia (Herrich-Schäffer, 1870)
Thysanopyga apicitruncaria Herrich-Schäffer, [1856]
Thysanopyga subpusaria (Herrich-Schäffer, 1870)
Trigrammia quadrinotaria Herrich-Schäffer, [1855]

Geometrinae
Chlorochlamys chloroleucaria (Guenée, [1858])
Chloropteryx paularia (Möschler, 1886)
Eucrostes dominicaria (Guenée, [1858])
Eueana niveociliaria (Herrich-Schäffer, 1870)
Nemoria lixaria (Guenée, [1858])
Nemoria rectilinea (Warren, 1906)
Oospila confundaria (Möschler, 1890)
Oospila decoloraria (Walker, 1861)
Phrudocentra centrifugaria (Herrich-Schäffer, 1870)
Synchlora cupedinaria (Grote, 1880)
Synchlora frondaria Guenée, [1858]
Synchlora herbaria (Fabricius, 1794)
Synchlora xysteraria (Hulst, 1886)

Sterrhinae
Cyclophora nanaria (Walker, 1861)
Cyclophora ordinata Walker, 1862
Cyclophora urcearia Guenée, [1858]
Idaea eupitheciata (Guenée, [1858])
Idaea furciferata (Packard, 1873)
Idaea insulensis (Rindge, 1958)
Idaea tenebrica (Warren, 1906)
Leptostales crossii (Hulst, 1900)
Leptostales laevitaria Geyer, 1837
Leptostales nigrofasciaria (Herrich-Schäffer, 1870)
Leptostales oblinataria (Möschler, 1890)
Leptostales pannaria (Guenée, [1858])
Leptostales penthemaria Dyar, 1913
Leptostales phorcaria (Guenée, [1858])
Leptostales praepeditaria (Möschler, 1890)
Leptostales terminata (Guenée, [1858])
Lobocleta nataria (Walker, 1866)
Lobocleta tenellata Möschler, 1886
Lophosis labeculata (Hulst, 1887)
Pleuroprucha asthenaria (Walker, 1861)
Pleuroprucha molitaria (Möschler, 1890)
Pleuroprucha rudimentaria (Guenée, [1858])
Pseudasellodes fenestraria (Guenée, 1857)
Ptychamalia perlata (Warren, 1900)
Scopula apparitaria (Walker, 1861)
Scopula canularia (Herrich-Schäffer, 1870)
Scopula chionaeata (Herrich-Schäffer, 1870)
Scopula compensata (Walker, 1861)
Scopula fernaria Schaus, 1940
Scopula juruana (Butler, 1881)
Scopula umbilicata (Fabricius, 1794)
Semaeopus caecaria (Hübner, [1823])
Semaeopus callichroa Prout, 1938
Semaeopus castaria (Guenée, [1858])
Semaeopus concomitans (Warren, 1906)
Semaeopus curta (Warren, 1906)
Semaeopus perletaria (Warren, 1906)

Larentiinae
Disclisioprocta stellata (Guenée, [1858])
Dyspteris abortivaria (Herrich-Schäffer, [1855])
Eois isographata (Walker, 1863)
Eois tegularia (Guenée, [1858])
Eubaphe pumilata (D. S. Fletcher, 1954)
Euphyia moeraria (Guenée, [1858])
Eupithecia succernata Möschler, 1886
Hagnagora ephestris (Felder & Rogenhofer, 1875)
Hammaptera parinotata (Zeller, 1872)
Heterusia lymnadoides (Prout, 1931)
Obila defensata (Walker, 1862)
Obila pannosata (Guenée, [1858])
Obila praecurraria (Möschler, 1890)
Psaliodes subochreofusa Herbulot, 1988
Spargania clementi Prout, 1931
Triphosa affirmata (Guenée, [1858])
Xanthorhoe herbicolor Prout, 1931

Noctuoidea

Notodontidae

Notodontinae
Cerura rarata (Walker, 1865)

Dudusinae
Antillisa lucedia Schaus, 1937
Antillisa toddi Torre & Alayo, 1959
Crinodes besckei Hübner, 1824
Hapigia directa Schaus, 1904

Heterocampinae
Boriza crossaea (Druce, 1894)
Heterocampa albidiscata Schaus, 1904
Heterocampa baracoana Schaus, 1904
Heterocampa cubana Grote, 1865
Heterocampa santiago Schaus, 1904
Heterocampa zayasi (Torre & Alayo, 1959)
Ianassa violascens (Herrich-Schäffer, 1855)
Malocampa punctata (Cramer, 1782)
Malocampa sida (Schaus, 1892)
Misogada pallida Schaus, 1904
Rifargia bichorda (Hampson, 1901)
Rifargia distinguenda (Walker, 1856)
Schizura pelialis Schaus, 1937

Nystaleinae
Bardaxima lucilinea (Walker, 1858)
Elasmia insularis (Grote, 1867)
Elymiotis morana Schaus, 1928
Hippia insularis (Grote, 1866)
Lepasta bractea (Felder, 1874)
Nystalea aequipars (Walker, 1858)
Nystalea ebalea (Stoll, 1779)
Nystalea indiana Grote, 1884
Nystalea superciliosa Guenée, 1852

Dioptinae
Eremonidiopsis aggregata Aguila, 2013

Erebidae

Lymantriinae
Dasychira manto (Strecker, 1900)
Eloria cubana Schaus, 1906
Orgyia leucostigma (Smith, 1797)

Arctiinae

Aclytia heber (Cramer, 1780)
Aethria dorsolineata Hampson, 1898
Agyrta dux (Walker, 1854)
Ammalo helops (Cramer, 1775)
Ammalo ramsdeni Schaus, 1925
Antichloris clementi Schaus, 1938
Apistosia humeralis Grote, 1867
Boenasa tricolor (Herrich-Schäffer, 1866)
Burtia cruenta (Herrich-Schäffer, 1866)
Burtia rubella Grote, 1866
Calidota cubensis (Grote, 1865)
Calidota strigosa (Walker, 1855)
Carales astur (Rothschild, 1909)
Carathis gortynoides Grote, 1865
Carathis alayorum Becker, 2011
Composia credula (Fabiricius, 1775)
Composia fidelissima Herrich-Schäffer, 1866
Correbidia terminalis (Walker, 1866)
Cosmosoma achemon (Fabricius, 1781)
Cosmosoma auge (Linnaeus, 1767)
Cosmosoma fenestrata (Drury, 1773)
Cosmosoma juanita Neumogen, 1894
Ctenucha bruneri Schaus, 1938
Ctenucha hilliana Dyar, 1915
Ctenuchidia gundlachia (Schaus, 1904)
Ctenuchidia virgo (Herrich-Schäffer, [1855])
Dahana cubana Schaus, 1904
Darantasia rumolda Schaus, 1925
Didaphne cyanomela (Neumogen, 1894)
Elysius barnesi Schaus, 1904
Empyreuma pugione (Linnaeus, 1767)
Episcepsis leneus (Cramer, 1779)
Episcepsis tethis (Linnaeus, 1771)
Estigmene acrea (Drury, 1773)
Eucereon guacolda (Poey, 1832)
Eucereon irrorata Schaus, 1904
Eudoliche osvalda Schaus, 1925
Eunomia caymanensis Hampson, 1911
Eunomia insularis Grote, 1866
Eunomia nitidula (Herrich-Schäffer, 1866)
Eupseudosoma involuta (Sepp, [1855])
Haemanota sanguinidorsia (Schaus, 1905)
Haemaphlebiella formona (Schaus, 1905)
Halysidota cinctipes Grote, 1865
Horama diffisa Grote, 1866
Horama margarita McCabe, 1992
Horama panthalon (Fabricius, 1793)
Horama pennipes (Grote, 1866)
Horama pretus (Cramer, 1777)
Horama zapata Dietz & Duckworth, 1976
Hyalurga vinosa (Drury, 1773)
Hypercompe albicornis (Grote, 1865)
Hypercompe decora (Walker, 1855)
Isanthrene ustrina Hübner, 1827
Lepidolutzia baucis (Dalman, 1823)
Leucanopsis tanamo (Schaus, 1904)
Lophocampa alternata (Grote, 1867)
Lophocampa atomosa (Walker, 1855)
Lophocampa grotei (Schaus, 1904)
Lophocampa luxa (Grote, 1865)
Lophocampa scripta (Grote, 1867)
Lymire albipennis (Herrich-Schäffer, 1866)
Lymire edwardsii Grote, 1881
Lymire lacina Schaus, 1925
Lymire subochrea (Herrich-Schäffer, 1866)
Lymire vedada Schaus, 1938
Mulona barnesi Field, 1952
Mulona schausi Field, 1952
Mydromera carmina Shaus, 1938
Nelphe carolina (H, Edwards, 1887)
Nyridela chalciope (Hübner, [1831])
Paramulona albulata (Herrich-Schäffer, 1866)
Paramulona baracoa Field, 1951
Paramulona nephelistis (Hampson, 1905)
Paramulona schwarzi Field, 1951
Pareuchaetes insulata (Walker, 1855)
Phaio longipennis Neumogen, 1894
Phoenicoprocta capistrata (Fabricius, 1775)
Pseudaclytia bambusana Schaus, 1938
Pseudocharis minima (Grote, 1867)
Robinsonia dewitzi Gundlach, 1881
Robinsonia evanida Schaus, 1905
Robinsonia formula Grote, 1865
Seripha plumbeola Hampson, 1909
Soritena habanera Schaus, 1924
Sphaeromachia cubana (Herrich-Schäffer, 1866)
Spilosoma jussiaeae (Poey, 1832)
Sthenognatha cinda (Schaus, 1938)
Syntomeida epilais (Walker, 1854)
Syntomeida wrighti (Gundlach, 1881)
Syntomidopsis gundlachiana (Neumogen, 1890)
Syntomidopsis variegata (Walker, 1854)
Tricypha proxima (Grote, 1867)
Uranophora chalybaea Hübner, [1831]
Utetheisa ornatrix (Linnaeus, 1758)
Virbia disparilis (Grote, 1865)
Virbia heros (Grote, 1865)
Virbia latus (Grote, 1865)
Virbia pallicornis (Grote, 1867)
Zellatilla columbia Dyar, 1914

Herminiinae
Aristaria bleptinalis Schaus, 1916
Aristaria theroalis (Walker, [1859])
Bleptina acastusalis Walker, [1859]
Bleptina araealis (Hampson, 1901)
Bleptina athusalis Schaus, 1916
Bleptina atymnusalis (Walker, [1859])
Bleptina baracoana Schaus, 1916
Bleptina caradrinalis Guenée, 1854
Bleptina carlona Schaus, 1916
Bleptina diopis (Hampson, 1904)
Bleptina hydrillalis Guenée, 1854
Bleptina menalcasalis Walker, [1859]
Bleptina muricolor Schaus, 1916
Bleptina pudesta Schaus, 1916
Carteris lineata (Druce, 1898)
Carteris oculatalis (Möschler, 1890)
Compsenia gracillima (Herrich-Schäffer, 1870)
Compsenia insulalis Schaus, 1916
Drepanoplapia lunifera (Butler, 1878)
Heterogramma terminalis (Herrich-Schäffer, 1870)
Hypenula deleona Schaus, 1916
Hypenula miriam Schaus, 1916
Lascoria alucitalis (Guenée, 1854)
Lascoria nigrirena (Herrich-Schäffer, 1870)
Lascoria orneodalis (Guenée, 1854)
Lophoditta tuberculata (Herrich-Schäffer, 1870)
Macristis geminipunctalis Schaus, 1916
Mastigophorus latipennis Herrich-Schäffer, 1870
Mastigophorus parra Poey, 1832
Phalaenophana eudorcalis (Guenée, 1854)
Phalaenophana santiagonis (Schaus, 1916)
Phlyctaina irrigualis Möschler, 1890
Physula acutalis Herrich-Schäffer, 1870
Physula albipunctilla Schaus, 1916
Physula albirenalis Herrich-Schäffer, 1870
Physula apicalis Herrich-Schäffer, 1870
Physula herminialis Herrich-Schäffer, 1870
Physula limonalis (Schaus, 1913)
Physula tristigalis Herrich-Schäffer, 1870
Physula variegalis Herrich-Schäffer, 1870
Rejectaria lysandria (Druce, 1891)
Salia ferrigeralis Walker, [1866]
Santiaxis copima Schaus, 1916
Sorygaza ramsdeni Schaus, 1916
Synomera isthmialis Schaus, 1916
Tetanolita mutatalis (Möschler, 1890)
Thursania aristarioides Schaus, 1916
Thursania costigutta (Herrich-Schäffer, 1870)
Thursania hobsonalis Schaus, 1916
Thursania miaralis Schaus, 1916
Thursania voodoalis Schaus, 1916

Hypeninae
Arrade linecites Schaus, 1916
Hypena abscisalis (Walker, 1858)
Hypena androna (Druce, 1890)
Hypena degesalis Walker, 1859
Hypena exoletalis Guenée, 1854
Hypena lividalis (Hübner, 1790)
Hypena mactatalis Walker, [1859]
Hypena minualis Guenée, 1854
Hypena porrectalis (Fabricius, 1794)
Hypena scabra (Fabricius, 1798)
Hypena subidalis Guenée, 1854
Hypena umbralis (Smith, 1884)
Hypena vetustalis Guenée, 1854

Rivulinae
Rivula pusilla Möschler, 1890

Scoliopteryginae
Alabama argillacea (Hübner, 1823)
Anomis catarhodois Dyar, 1913
Anomis editrix (Guenée, 1852)
Anomis erosa Hübner, 1821
Anomis exacta Hübner, 1822
Anomis flava (Stephens, 1829)
Anomis gundlachi Schaus, 1940
Anomis hedys (Dyar, 1913)
Anomis illita Guenée, 1852
Anomis impasta Guenée, 1852
Anomis innocua Schaus, 1940
Anomis orthopasta Dyar, 1913
Anomis tingenscens Dyar, 1913

Calpinae
Adiopa disgrega (Möschler, 1890)
Dialithis gemmifera Hübner, [1821]
Eudocima apta (Walker, [1858])
Eudocima serpentifera (Walker, [1858])
Eudocima toddi (Zayas, 1965)
Gonodonta bidens Geyer, 1832
Gonodonta clotilda (Stoll, 1790)
Gonodonta incurva (Sepp, [1840])
Gonodonta nitidimacula Guenée, 1852
Gonodonta nutrix (Stoll, 1780)
Gonodonta sicheas (Cramer, 1777)
Gonodonta unica Neumoegen, 1891
Gonodonta uxor (Cramer, 1780)
Graphigona regina (Guenée, 1852)
Ipnista marina (Druce, 1891)
Oraesia excitans Walker, [1858]
Parachabora abydas (Herrich-Schäffer, [1869])
Parachabora triangulifera Hampson, 1901
Plusiodonta clavifera (Walker, 1869)
Plusiodonta stimulans (Walker, [1858])
Plusiodonta thomae Guenée, 1852

Hypocalinae
Hypocala andremona (Stoll, 1781)
Hypsoropha adeona Druce, 1889

Scoleocampinae
Palpidia pallidior Dyar, 1898

Hypenodinae
Schrankia macula (Druce, 1891)

Boletobiinae
Metalectra analis Schaus, 1916
Metalectra geminicincta Schaus, 1916
Metalectra tanamensis Schaus, 1916

Eublemminae
Eublemma cinnamomea (Herrich-Schäffer, 1868)
Eublemma minima (Guenée, 1852)
Eublemma recta (Guenée, 1852)

Phytometrinae
Aglaonice otignatha Hampson, 1924
Bradunia guanabana Schaus, 1916
Cecharismena abarusalis (Walker, 1859)
Cecharismena cara Möschler, 1890
Cecharismena nectarea Möschler, 1890
Glympis arenalis (Walker, [1866])
Glympis concors (Hübner, 1823)
Glympis eubolialis (Walker, [1866])
Glympis holothermes Hampson, 1926
Hemeroplanis apicigutta Herrich-Schäffer, 1869
Hemeroplanis scopulepes (Haworth, 1809)
Hemeroplanis zayasi Todd, 1960
Hormoschista latipalpis (Walker, 1858)
Isogona scindens (Walker, 1858)
Janseodes melanospila (Guenée, 1852)
Mursa gracilis (Möschler, 1890)
Mursa phtisialis (Guenée, 1854)
Mursa sotiusalis (Walker, 1859)
Ommatochila mundula (Zeller, 1872)
Phytometra ernestinana (Blanchard, 1840)
Radara nealcesalis (Walker, 1859)

Anobinae
Anoba pohli Felder, 1894
Baniana relapsa (Walker, 1858)
Deinopa biligula (Guenée, 1852)

Erebinae
Acanthodica grandis Schaus, 1894
Achaea ablunaris (Guenée, 1852)
Argidia subvelata (Walker, 1865)
Ascalapha odorata (Linnaeus, 1758)
Bulia confirmans Walker, [1858]
Caenurgia chloropha (Hübner, 1818)
Calyptis iter Guenée, 1852
Celiptera cometophora Hampson, 1913
Celiptera frustulum Guenée, 1852
Celiptera levina (Stoll, 1782)
Celiptera remigioides Guenée, 1852
Coenipeta bibitrix (Hübner, 1823)
Coenipeta medina Guenée, 1852
Doryodes insularia Hampson, 1914
Dyops chromatophila (Walker, 1858)
Elousa albicans Walker, [1858]
Epidromia lienaris (Hübner, 1823)
Euclystis angularis (Möschler, 1886)
Euclystis guerini (Guenée, 1852)
Gonodontodes dispar Hampson, 1913
Hemeroblemma numeria (Drury, [1773])
Hemeroblemma opigena (Drury, 1773)
Hemicephalis phoenicias (Hampson, 1926)
Itomia xylina Herrich-Schäffer, 1869
Kakopoda progenies (Guenée, 1852)
Latebraria amphipyroides Guenée, 1852
Lesmone detrahens (Walker, 1858)
Lesmone formularis (Zeller, 1837)
Lesmone gurda (Guenée, 1852)
Lesmone hinna (Geyer, 1837)
Letis hypnois (Hübner, [1821])
Letis mycerina (Cramer, 1777)
Letis xylia Guenée, 1852
Melipotis acontioides (Guenée, 1852)
Melipotis contorta (Guenée, 1852)
Melipotis famelica (Guenée, 1852)
Melipotis fasciolaris (Hübner, [1831])
Melipotis januaris (Guenée, 1852)
Melipotis ochrodes (Guenée, 1852)
Melipotis prolata (Walker, [1858])
Metria acharia (Stoll, 1781)
Metria decessa (Walker, 1857)
Metria irresoluta (Walker, 1858)
Mimophisma forbesi Schaus, 1940
Mocis cubana Hampson, 1913
Mocis diffluens (Guenée, 1852)
Mocis disseverans (Walker, 1858)
Mocis latipes (Guenée, 1852)
Mocis marcida (Guenée, 1852)
Mocis repanda (Fabricius, 1794)
Ophisma tropicalis Guenée, 1852
Orodesma apicina Herrich-Schäffer, 1868
Panula inconstans Guenée, 1852
Pararcte immanis (Walker, 1858)
Perasia garnoti (Guenée, 1852)
Perasia helvina (Guenée, 1852)
Perasia lineolaris (Hübner, 1809)
Polionycta attina (Druce, 1898)
Ptichodis bistriga (Herrich-Schäffer, 1869)
Ptichodis immunis (Guenée, 1852)
Selenisa suero (Cramer, 1777)
Selenisa sueroides (Guenée, 1852)
Thysania zenobia (Cramer, 1777)
Toxonprucha diffundens (Walker, 1858)
Tyrissa recurva Walker, 1866
Zale albidula (Walker, 1865)
Zale fictilis (Guenée, 1852)
Zale lunata (Drury, [1773])
Zale peruncta (Walker, 1858)
Zale setipes (Guenée, 1852)

Eulepidotinae
Antiblemma harmodia Schaus, 1901
Antiblemma inconspicuum (Herrich-Schäffer, 1870)
Antiblemma mundicola (Walker, 1865)
Antiblemma nannodes Hampson, 1926
Antiblemma punctistriga (Herrich-Schäffer, 1870)
Antiblemma rufinans (Guenée, 1852)
Antiblemma sterope (Stoll, 1780)
Antiblemma versicolor (Herrich-Schäffer, 1870)
Anticarsia gemmatalis Hübner, 1818
Athyrma adjutrix of authors (not Cramer, 1780)
Azeta quassa Walker, 1858
Azeta versicolor (Fabricius, 1794)
Azeta uncas Guenée, 1852
Chamyna homichlodes Hübner, [1821]
Chamyna modesta Schaus, 1912
Coenobela joha (Druce, 1898)
Coenobela paucula (Walker, 1858)
Dyomyx inferior (Herrich-Schäffer, 1869)
Dyomyx juno Möschler, 1890
Ephyrodes cacata Guenée, 1852
Ephyrodes omicron Guenée, 1852
Epitausa coppryi (Guenée, 1852)
Eulepidotis addens (Walker, 1858)
Eulepidotis hebe (Möschler, 1890)
Eulepidotis merricki (Holland, 1902)
Eulepidotis metamorpha Dyar, 1914
Eulepidotis modestula (Herrich-Schäffer, 1869)
Eulepidotis reflexa (Herrich-Schäffer, 1869)
Eulepidotis striaepuncta (Herrich-Schäffer, 1868)
Glenopteris occulifera Hübner, [1821]
Goniocarsia electrica (Schaus, 1894)
Litoprosopus hatuey (Poey, 1832)
Macrodes cynara (Cramer, 1775)
Manbuta pyraliformis (Walker, 1858)
Massala abdara (Herrich-Schäffer, [1869])
Massala obvertens (Walker, 1858)
Metallata absumens (Walker, 1862)
Phyprosopus pardan Dyar, 1921
Phyprosopus tristriga (Möschler, 1890)
Renodes aequalis (Walker, [1866])
Renodes eupithecioides (Walker, 1858)
Syllectra congemmalis Hübner, 1823
Syllectra erycata (Cramer, 1780)

Euteliidae

Euteliinae
Eutelia ablatrix (Guenée, 1852)
Eutelia caustiplaga Hampson, 1905
Eutelia furcata (Walker, 1865)
Paectes abrostoloides (Guenée, 1852)
Paectes arcigera (Guenée, 1852)
Paectes canofusa (Hampson, 1898)
Paectes devincta (Walker, 1858)
Paectes lunodes (Guenée, 1852)
Paectes obrotunda (Guenée, 1852)
Paectes vittata (Möschler, 1890)

Stictopterinae
Nagara vitrea (Guenée, 1852)

Nolidae

Nolinae
Nola baracoa Schaus, 1921
Nola bistriga (Möschler, 1890)
Nola cereella (Bosc, [1800])
Nola cubensis Schaus, 1921
Nola folgona Schaus, 1921

Chloephorinae
Garella nilotica (Rogenhofer, 1881)
Iscadia aperta Walker, 1857
Iscadia furcifera (Walker, 1865)

Collomeninae
Collomena filifera (Walker, 1857)
Concana mundissima Walker, [1858]
Motya abseuzalis Walker, 1859
Motya ferrocana (Walker, 1857)

Afridinae
Afrida charientisma Dyar, 1913
Afrida cosmiogramma Dyar, 1913
Afrida interdicta Dyar, 1913

Noctuidae

Plusiinae
Argyrogramma verruca (Fabricius, 1794)
Autoplusia egena (Guenée, 1852)
Chrysodeixis includens (Walker, [1858])
Ctenoplusia calceolaris (Walker, [1858])
Ctenoplusia oxygramma (Geyer, 1832)
Enigmogramma admonens (Walker, [1858])
Enigmogramma antillea Becker, 2001
Enigmogramma basigera (Walker, 1865)
Mouralia tinctoides (Guenée, 1852)
Notioplusia illustrata (Guenée, 1852)
Rachiplusia ou (Guenée, 1852)
Trichoplusia ni (Hübner, [1803])

Bagisarinae
Amyna axis (Guenée, 1852)
Bagisara repanda (Fabricius, 1793)
Bagisara tristicta (Hampson, 1898)

Cydosiinae
Cydosia nobilitella (Cramer, [1780])

Eustrotiinae
Chobata discalis Walker, [1858]
Cobubatha metaspilaris Walker, 1863
Eustrotia girba Druce, 1889
Marimatha tripuncta (Möschler, 1890)
Marimatha botyoides (Guenée, 1852)
Marimatha obliquata (Herrich-Schäffer, 1868)
Tripudia goyanensis (Hampson, 1910)
Tripudia grapholithoides (Möschler, 1890)
Tripudia lamina Pogue, 2009
Tripudia luda (Druce, 1898)

Acontiinae
Ponometia bicolorata (Barnes & McDunnough, 1912)
Ponometia exigua (Fabricius, 1793)
Ponometia semiflava (Guenée, 1852)
Ponometia septuosa (Blanchard & Knudson, 1986)
Spragueia apicalis (Herrich-Schäffer, 1868)
Spragueia dama (Guenée, 1852)
Spragueia margana (Fabricius, 1794)
Spragueia pantherula (Herrich-Schäffer, 1868)
Spragueia perstructana (Walker, 1865)
Tarache isolata (Todd, 1960)
Tarache tetragona (Walker, [1858])

Diphtherinae
Diphthera festiva (Fabricius, 1775)

Acronictinae
Chytonidia chloe Schaus, 1914
Simyra insularis (Herrich-Schäffer, 1868)

Amphipyrinae
Cropia connecta (Smith, 1894)
Cropia indigna (Walker, [1858])
Cropia infusa (Walker, [1858])
Cropia subapicalis (Walker, 1858)
Cropia templada (Schaus, 1906)
Fracara viridata (Stoll, 1782)
Metaponpneumata rogenhoferi Möschler, 1890
Paratrachaea berylloides (Hampson, 1908)

Oncocnemidinae
Antachara diminuta (Guenée, 1852)
Catabenoides vitrina (Walker, 1857)
Neogalea sunia (Guenée, 1852)

Agaristinae
Caularis lunata Hampson, 1904
Eudryas unio (Hübner, [1831])
Euscirrhopterus poeyi Grote, 1866
Neotuerta hemicycla (Hampson, 1904)
Neotuerta sabulosa (Todd, 1966)
Seirocastnia tribuna (Hübner, [1821])

Condicinae
Condica albigera (Guenée, 1852)
Condica berinda Druce, 1889
Condica circuita (Guenée, 1852)
Condica concisa (Walker, 1856)
Condica cupentia (Cramer, 1780)
Condica mimica Hampson, 1908
Condica mobilis (Walker, [1857])
Condica punctifera (Walker, [1857])
Condica selenosa Guenée, 1852
Condica stelligera (Guenée, 1852)
Condica subaurea (Guenée, 1852)
Condica subornata Walker, 1865
Condica sutor (Guenée, 1852)
Homophoberia apicosa (Haworth, [1809])
Micrathetis dasarada (Druce, 1898)
Micrathetis triplex (Walker, 1857)
Perigea funerea Schaus, 1911
Perigea glaucoptera (Guenée, 1852)
Perigea pectinata (Herrich-Schäffer, 1868)

Heliothinae
Helicoverpa zea (Boddie, 1850)
Heliothis subflexa (Guenée, 1852)
Heliothis virescens (Fabricius, 1777)

Eriopinae
Callopistria floridensis (Guenée, 1852)
Callopistria jamaicensis (Möschler, 1886)
Callopistria mollissima (Guenée, 1852)

Noctuinae
Agrotis apicalis Herrich-Schäffer, 1868
Agrotis malefida Guenée, 1852
Anarta florida (Smith, 1900)
Anicla infecta (Ochsenheimer, 1816)
Anicla recondita (Möschler, 1890)
Bellura matanzasensis (Dyar, 1922)
Dargida quadrannulata (Morrison, 1876)
Dypterygia lignaris (Schaus, 1898)
Dypterygia ordinarius (Butler, 1879)
Elaphria agrotina (Guenée, 1852)
Elaphria deliriosa (Walker, 1857)
Elaphria deltoides (Möschler, 1880)
Elaphria devara (Druce, 1898)
Elaphria guttula (Herrich-Schäffer, 1868)
Elaphria haemassa (Hampson, 1909)
Elaphria hypophaea (Hampson, 1920)
Elaphria nucicolora (Guenée, 1852)
Feltia repleta Walker, 1857
Feltia subterranea (Fabricius, 1794)
Galgula partita Guenée, 1852
Glaucicodia leuconephra Hampson, 1910
Gonodes trapezoides (Herrich-Schäffer, 1868)
Iodopepla alayoi Todd, 1964
Lacinipolia calcaricosta Todd & Poole, 1981
Lacinipolia distributa (Möschler, 1886)
Lacinipolia parvula (Herrich-Schäffer, 1868)
Leucania chejela (Schaus, 1921)
Leucania clarescens Möschler, 1890
Leucania dorsalis Walker, 1856
Leucania educata Adams, 2001
Leucania humidicola Guenée, 1852
Leucania incognita (Barnes & McDunnough, 1918)
Leucania inconspicua Herrich-Schäffer, 1868
Leucania latiuscula Herrich-Schäffer, 1868
Leucania lobrega Adams, 2001
Leucania rawlinsi Adams, 2001
Leucania secta Herrich-Schäffer, 1868
Leucania senescens Möschler, 1890
Leucania toddi Adams, 2001
Magusa orbifera (Walker, 1857)
Mamestra soligena Möschler, 1886
Marilopteryx lamptera (Druce, 1890)
Marilopteryx lutina (Smith, 1902)
Mythimna sequax (Franclemont, 1951)
Mythimna unipuncta (Haworth, 1809)
Neophaenis respondens (Walker, 1858)
Orthodes jamaicensis Hampson, 1905
Orthodes majuscula Herrich-Schäffer, 1868
Peridroma saucia (Hübner, [1808])
Phuphena tura (Druce, 1889)
Prasinopyra metacausta (Hampson, 1910)
Sesamia cretica Lederer, 1857
Speocropia scriptura (Walker, 1858)
Speocropia trichroma (Herrich-Schäffer, 1868)
Spodoptera albula (Walker, 1859)
Spodoptera androgea (Stoll, 1782)
Spodoptera dolichos (Fabricius, 1794)
Spodoptera eridania (Stoll, 1782)
Spodoptera frugiperda (Smith, 1797)
Spodoptera latifascia (Walker, 1856)
Spodoptera ornithogalli (Guenée, 1852)
Spodoptera pulchella (Herrich-Schäffer, 1868)
Tiracola grandirena (Herrich-Schäffer, 1868)
Xanthopastis regnatrix (Grote, 1863)

References

Checklist of the Lepidoptera of the Antilles

 
Lepidoptera
Lepidoptera

Cuba
Cuba
Cuba